Athurugiriya is a suburb of Colombo in Colombo District, Sri Lanka. This suburb is a highly sought after residential centre in Colombo.

History 
History of the area dates back to at least 212 BC. Brahmi inscriptions on the cave temple mention a dedication from the daughter of  King Walagamba and a local official.

This temple has two important historical inscriptions, which says this temple was offer to Maha Sanga by a daughter of Mahachula Mahatissa. Second one says one cave offered to Maha Sanga by a provincial leader call Sumana.

Transport 

Athurugiriya is a major urban centre located along the road connecting Malabe on New Kandy Road, and Godagama on High Level Road. In addition, Kaduwela and Thalawathugoda are major urban centres nearby.

Residential

Athurugiriya is a highly sought after residential area in Colombo. Many important government office complexes; such as Sethsiripaya, Suhurupaya, Isurupaya and many other government institutions in Denzil Kobbekaduwa Mawatha; are situated within  of Athurugiriya.

Upper-middle class housing complex Millennium City is located within  from Athurugiriya.

See also 
Millennium City incident

References

Populated places in Colombo District
Suburbs of Colombo